The All-Union Film Festival (tr.:Vsesoyuznyy kinofestival, also known as ВКФ; VKF) was one of the most important film festivals of the Soviet Union. It was founded in 1958 and held regularly from 1964-1988.  It was held annually from 1972 onwards, and bi-annually before that (before 1964, there were festivals in the years 1958, 1959 and 1960). Its time and location were determined by Goskino and the Union of Soviet Composers.

There were four categories among which prizes were handed out: 
Fiction films
Documentaries, scientific-popular films, and film-journals
Fiction films for children and youth (from 1977)
Animated films (from 1977)

Locations
 1964, Leningrad
 1966, Kiev
 1968, Leningrad
 1970, Minsk
 1972, Tbilisi
 1973, Alma-Ata
 1974, Baku
 1975, Kishinev
 1976, Frunze
 1977, Riga
 1978, Yerevan
 1979, Ashgabad
 1980, Dushanbe
 1981, Vilnius
 1982, Tallinn
 1983, Leningrad
 1984, Kiev
 1985, Minsk
 1986, Alma-Ata
 1987, Tbilisi
 1988, Baku

References

Defunct film festivals
Film festivals in the Soviet Union